Kochi City Police (KCP), officially the Police Commissionerate Kochi, is the police force of the Indian city of Kochi. The force is headed by a Police Commissioner, an IPS officer. The city police was reorganized as Metro Police force, on 1 April 1966, after forming City Corporation of Cochin. Kochi City Police is one of the most advanced police force, considering the strategic importance of the city.

History 

In 1947, the Cochin State Royal Police was merged with Royal Travancore Police to form Travancore-Kochi State Police. After formation of Kerala, this force became part of Kerala Police. That time, the Kochi city had 3 police departments, namely Fort Kochi Police, Mattancherry Police and Ernakulam City Police. In 1960 when 3 municipalities was merged to form Cochin City Corporation, the force too was renamed as Kochi City Police.

Organization 

The Kochi City Police is headed by City Police Commissioner who also is Foreigners Registration Officer with executive powers for granting immigration status to non-nationals. The Commissioner is from IPS Kerala Cadre and current incumbent is Mr. K Sethu Raman IPS. The commissioner is assisted two DCPs . The DCP (L&O and Traffic) is assisted by 6 Assistant Commissioners (ACP),four for sub divisions and two for traffic. The city is divided into 4 sub divisions, each headed by an Assistant Commissioners (ACPs). The city has 27 police stations, each led by an Inspector and one cyber Crime police station.

The Commissioner reports to ADGP(Law&Order) of the state.

Divisions

Control Room- 112 

The Central Control Room is the major coordinating center that co-ordinates the entire movements of police force for the city. Public can reach the control room, by making distress toll-free call 112 in any telephonic device. The Control room maintains 12 Flying Squads (High Fast Patrol Team), in major points of the city and upon distress call, the control room identifies the location of call and directs the nearest squad rush to the spot. The Kochi city Police monitoring the pulses of the city through ITMS system (Intelligent Traffic Management System) effectively.

Anti-Narcotics Squad (ANS)

The District Anti Narcotic Special Action Force is functioning under an Assistant Commissioner of Police (Narcotic Cell) that checks use and trafficking of narcotics and banned psychotropic drugs. Currently the cell operates at Narcotic Cell,Commissioner Office, Kochi City and has DANSAF (District Anti-Narcotic Special Action Force) team as Operational wing.

Vanitha Station (Women's Police Station) 

For the protection and assistance of single women and children, a  women police station functions with women police officers led by an Inspector of Police. A medical counselor functions in the station, to solve family disputes and provide counselling facilities to needy. The station also handles crimes that involve ladies and juveniles' offenders. Currently the station is located at Police Quarters near High Court of Kerala.

Special Branch (SB)

This forms an intelligence unit for Kochi City Police force, where information gathered at all corners is collected, analyzed and recorded to regular use. The SB has various methods to gather information and employs Mafti (Under-cover) force for information.

District Head Quarters 

Kochi Police maintains 2 units of District Head Quarters. </ref> The District Head Quarters Kochi Police is located at Thrippunithura and Marine Drive.3 Companies each are maintained in DHQ-Thrippunithura and DHQ-Marine Drive.
In addition, 3 major squads are maintained at District Head Quarters.

TEAR GAS SQUAD: A Tear Gas Squad is functioning at DHQ Kochi City to deal with emergency situations.

BOMB SQUAD: The trained Bomb Squad unit is functioning under Kochi City Police.

DOG SQUAD: Dog Squad Units of District Head Quarters, Ernakulam and Thrippunithura are functioning under the charge of one SI.  5 Sniffer Dogs and 3 Tracker Dogs are available in this Squad.

City Traffic Police

Kochi City Traffic Police, is a semi-autonomous body with 2 Assistant Commissioners taking the lead. There are 2 divisions, the Regulatory Office located near Central Police Station(Traffic West) and second at Edappally (Traffic East).

Initiatives

Janamythri Suraksha  Project 

The Assistant Commissioner (Narcotic Cell) is the district Nodal officer of Janamythri Suraksha Project.Being the District Nodal officer of the Janamythri Suraksha  Project, coordinate all the activities of Janamythri including supervision of Janamythri M Beat, collection of intelligence by Janamythri Beat officers, Janamythri Samithi meeting, Residence Association meeting and also conduct weekly review of Janamythri Beat officers performance. During the year 2021 Janamythri beat officers’ conduct 34,078 nos of house visit. Various other programmes conducted by Beat officers are –
1)	As per the instructions from JMSP Directorate Beat officers are deputed for Covid -19 enforcement duties. 
2)	Udayamperoor police provided Notebooks and other educational material aids to school students those who are suffering financial crisis. 
3)	3 Mobile Phones are provided to selected students by Fort Kochi Police. 
4)	An auto taxi started at Harbour PS limit for the transportation of Covid patients with the co-operation of residents association. 
5)	Besides these all-police stations are provided food kit to wandering people during lock down days. 

 	 Women self defence programme 
The women self-defence teams in all districts have been reconstituted vide Executive Directive No. 03/2022 /PHQ Dtd 27.02.2022.  As per Order No. 15/SPMC/PHQ/2022 Dtd 22.02.2022, ACP Narcotic Cell who in charge of Janamythri Police will be the Nodal officer of Women self defence programme. Some of the Police officers of Kochi city are detailed for giving self-defense training to the women and college students.

STUDENT POLICE CADET PROJECT, KOCHI CITY 

	Student Police Cadet Project is a farsighted school based initiative, aims to complement the education system through strengthening values, behavior and attributes of the youth through a two years program of training and personality development, which enables students to evolve as responsible and capable citizens of a democratic society by inculcating in them respect for the law, inner capability, self discipline, civic sense, empathy towards vulnerable sections of society and resistance to social evils.

	The SPC training program comprises various modules meant to facilitate each cadet with learning inputs to acquire desired capabilities of future citizens through a regular two year course of physical fitness training, parade training, indoor classes, workshops on law and citizenship, field visits to Government institutions and Judicial offices of Law enforcement, Mini Projects and leadership camps.

 KadaloraJagrathaSamithies 
In Kochi City Kadalora Jagratha Samithies have constituted for the safety of people in coastal areas. ACP Mattanchery has monitored the meetings and time to time actions regarding the coastal area issues. Various activities were organized under the state plan scheme for the financial year 2018- 2019. 

 CHILD FRIENDLY POLICE STATIONS 
Ten police stations,  Fort kochi, Palluruthy, THoppumpady, Central, ET North, Kadavanthra, ET South, Vanitha, Cyber, Infopark etc. have child friendly facilities In Kochi city. In the pandemic situations online program and counseling were conducted for refreshing the students.   Child suicide details have been collected from police stations and women cell officials visited affected houses for console and provide moral support to the family members. Instructions were given to the child friendly police stations for collect the details of drop out students, and make arrangements to continue their further study. District CAP center started at Central Police Station for the co-ordination of the project in Kochi City. 
 Koottu 
Kerala Police's cyberdome has launched a new project for sexually exploited children in association with organization Bachpan Bachao Andolan'''. The project named "Koottu" works as a handout for child survivors of cyber crime and other sexual exploitation.
This project also aims to provide pre-trial counseling to children who have been subjected to sexual violence. The T project helps children survive sexual abuse and face trial with confidence. Along with this, the scheme provides psychological and social support to the children and their families. For this, ensuring the child's academic progress, ensuring the social rehabilitation of the child, and various resources from the government for the deceased.
This completely free program is run by trained mental health professionals and the police. The scheme aims to ensure the most suitable rehabilitation of the surviving children and their families without infringing their rights in any way while giving utmost importance to their privacy.

References

External links
 Official website of the Kochi city police

Metropolitan law enforcement agencies of India
Government of Kochi
Kerala Police
1966 establishments in Kerala
Government agencies established in 1966